The Hawkins House is a historic house at the northwest corner of 3rd Avenue and 3rd Street in Foreman, Arkansas.  It is a -story wood-frame structure, built in 1912, and is one of the city's few surviving properties from its boom period in the early 20th century, dating to the arrival of the railroad.  It is a vernacular Foursquare house, given an L shape by the attachment of a hip-roofed ell to its northwestern corner.  Its front elevation is dominated by a two-story recessed porch, supported by concrete block columns.

The house was listed on the National Register of Historic Places in 1996.

See also
National Register of Historic Places listings in Little River County, Arkansas

References

Houses on the National Register of Historic Places in Arkansas
Houses completed in 1912
Houses in Little River County, Arkansas
1912 establishments in Arkansas
National Register of Historic Places in Little River County, Arkansas